Unfurnished Rooms is the ninth studio album by English band Blancmange, released in 2017. It was produced by Neil Arthur and Benge, and reached No. 40 on the UK Independent Albums Chart.

The album was Blancmange's first release since First Light, a 2017 collaborative album between Arthur and Benge, released under the name Fader. Speaking to MusicOMH in 2017, Arthur commented on Benge's involvement with Unfurnished Rooms: "It was fantastic when he said he was up for getting involved. I'd written the songs and a lot of instrumentation. I put my electronic noises on, and the idea was for Benge to replace the rhythm area."

Critical reception

Upon release, Michael Hann of The Quietus described the album as "pleasing", adding: "...as if Blancmange have journeyed back to the early 1980s and taken a different turning". Paul Scott-Bates of Louder Than War summarised the album as "clever". He said: "It sees Neil Arthur on top form and putting together a listening experience that has taken thought, passion and a great deal of bravery." D Foist of Record Collector wrote: "Unfurnished Rooms still has the synthpop undercarriage, but feels more like an assured indie collection than anything else. A hint of glam pokes through here and there, but also a good dose of the stodgier end of Depeche Mode's output."

Track listing

Chart performance

Personnel
 Neil Arthur - vocals, synthesiser, guitar, percussion, producer, recording, arrangement, mixing, artwork
 Benge - synthesiser, drum machine, producer, recording, arrangement, mixing
 David Rhodes - additional guitar (track 1–2, 4, 7–9)
 John Grant - piano, backing vocals (track 10)
 Shawn Joseph - mastering

Other
 Adam Yeldham - layout
 Steve Malins - management

References

2017 albums
Blancmange (band) albums